Detective Calleigh Duquesne is a fictional character on the CBS crime drama CSI: Miami, portrayed by Emily Procter.

Background 
Calleigh is a ballistics and tool mark specialist originally from Louisiana. She is fluent in Spanish and has a bachelor's degree in Physics from Tulane University. While working for the New Orleans Police Department, she was given the nickname "Bullet Girl" for her knowledge of, and expertise with, firearms. 
Calleigh is an almost eternal optimist, with a sunny disposition and a smile to match. However, this attitude does not in any way interfere with her quest to put criminals where they belong. She is well liked by all her co-workers, although they sometimes remark on her being almost "way too happy". And, while she does not believe in supernatural curses and the like, she does believe in karma. Though her time as a CSI has exposed her to intense violence and gore, in season 2 it is shown that she has an intense fear of ants that Eric Delko helps her overcome.
In season 7, it's also shown that Calleigh uses a Sanyo Pro-700 that has been digitally modified to have as big a screen as her cell phone.

Relationships 

Her father, Kenwall "Duke" Duquesne (John Heard), is an alcoholic and a defense attorney who has tried to rehabilitate himself several times. Calleigh sometimes helps him by picking him up and driving home when he is too drunk to do so himself. When he comes to the lab to confess that he might have killed someone while driving drunk, she lies to her boss, Horatio Caine, to protect her father. Her father sometimes calls her "Lambchop".

Calleigh states that her mother wanted to be viewed more as a friend than an authority figure, and wistfully wonders whether a nanny might have been a voice of reason in the house.

Her parents divorced around 1992, and the separation was bitter and hostile.

Calleigh reveals that she once dated a Marine Corps Special Ops sniper, now retired, who helps Horatio understand the mindset of a sniper on a spree in downtown Miami.

Calleigh has a brief relationship with Detective John Hagen (Holt McCallany), former partner of Horatio's brother Raymond, in season 2; they break up when he goes on leave for a "bad back." Ryan Wolfe, to her shock, informs her that a bad back is a euphemism for not passing the department psychological evaluation. In the season 3 finale, a deeply depressed Hagen steals a crucial piece of evidence from a crime scene, possibly to produce it later and look like a hero. Unfortunately for him, Calleigh notices the void when she comes to photograph the scene, and Hagen comes up from behind, pulls his gun on her, and flees. Though at the time she does not know that he is the perpetrator, she remembers vividly the sound of the gun cock, and recognizes it moments before Hagen commits suicide in the ballistics lab. She finds the missing evidence in his jacket pocket as the coroners wheel out his body.

She also shares a mutual attraction with Special Agent Peter Elliott, a Secret Service agent from the Financial Crimes Division, when they first meet. Hagen, in jealousy and hostility, tells Elliott to back off from Calleigh. Elliott becomes engaged to state attorney Monica West, but neglects to inform Calleigh of this, continuing to offer warm overtures to her. Calleigh is naturally upset and angry when his fiancée walks in and introduces herself, though Elliott tries to defend himself by saying that he was going to tell her soon. Later, when the lab is under investigation by the FBI, Calleigh determines that Elliott was the last person to handle the money that went missing from evidence, and that it is Monica West who is leaking false information that discredited the Miami-Dade Crime Lab, as well as stealing the money. Despite their fallings-out, Calleigh and Elliott remain friends, and she calls him in to determine the authenticity of money they confiscated during the course of a case.

Ryan Wolfe's first case upon joining the lab investigates the possibility that Calleigh's father killed a man while driving under the influence of alcohol. Therefore, Calleigh and Ryan's relationship begins on a bit of a sour note. However, Calleigh soon grows to accept him as a colleague, frequently assisting him when he was still a rookie. She is often caught in the middle of verbal sniping between Ryan and Eric Delko before the two made up and became friends. She later buys an iPod for Ryan's niece, and, when he pays her back with a $100 bill, she is dismayed to learn from Federal Agent Peter Elliot that the bill is counterfeit. Though Calleigh confronts Ryan about his participation in the very Death Pool they are investigating (the source of the fake money), she does not follow up officially, and Ryan destroys all his "winnings" shortly afterwards. The two have grown to be closer friends. In season 4, episode 16, Calleigh and Ryan argue over the morals regarding the case and a rumor spreads that the two have fought. At the end of the episode Calleigh invites Ryan out for a beer after work and the two smile at each other implying that the argument from earlier has been forgotten. In season 7, episode 20, after Ryan is kidnapped, Calleigh shows great concern for his discrepancies.

During an investigation in 2006, another of her former love-interests surfaces: an undercover ATF agent, Jake Berkeley. Unfortunately, she wrongly became convinced that Berkeley had become too enamored of his role in a weapons-dealing, drug-using motorcycle gang, and at one point Calleigh suspects he murdered his clean partner, Ken McCartney, though this assumption is later proved false. They resumed their relationship by the end of season 5. In fact, Calleigh goes to Antigua with Jake on her "first vacation in a long time," so it can be presumed that they are involved in a significant romantic relationship. After the details of their relationship are leaked, Jake suggests that they should take a break from each other in order to continue working together. It isn't a break that lasts for long, as they are soon holding hands just outside the lab. After a pleasant brunch in which they both enjoy mimosas, Calleigh is involved in a shooting, leading to her being investigated by IAB. Calleigh confronts Jake about some extra mimosas on their tab, upset that the extra drinks call her own sobriety into question. She tells Jake that he may not be the right cop for her case, but Jake is the one who later exonerates her by finding the key piece of evidence.

After colleague and friend Eric Delko is critically wounded in the line of duty, Calleigh and fellow CSI Ryan Wolfe go to the hospital to give him blood, but they learn that they are too late and that he is on plasma due to catastrophic blood loss. Calleigh and the others take turns at his bedside; she places her cross necklace in his hand to show how much she cares, and is scared for him while he is unconscious (Eric is Roman Catholic). She is the first to talk to Eric after he wakes up, and the first to learn of his impaired memory when he asks for his months-dead sister Marisol. Calleigh, not wishing to upset Eric in his critical condition by reminding him of her tragic murder, demurs for the time being. She is instrumental in discovering his shooter by her analysis of the bullet fragment recovered from Eric's head. After Delko's return to work, Calleigh keeps a close eye on him, going over his reports and hoping his recovery is as complete as they would like. Unfortunately, she discovers a small but critical error in his procedure, which almost allows a killer to escape justice. Later, a depressed Delko declines to join her in the interview room, saying forlornly he came back to work too soon, even though he earlier provided critical insight to the case. Sympathetic, Calleigh allows him to sit out the interrogation. The impairment of Eric's memory is further demonstrated when he fails to remember the woman who was suing him, and Calleigh intervenes for him. Eric appreciates that, and Calleigh appreciates being appreciated, at which point she surprises him by kissing him on the cheek. After Jake is involved in an accident, Calleigh and Eric share a moment in which she verbally compares the relationship she has with both men, revealing that while she doesn't know how she feels about Jake, she trusts Eric with her life. This comparison seems to please Eric. Later, Calleigh and Jake kiss, with Eric looking on jealously.  Calleigh notices that Eric had seen the kiss - and his strained expression - and looks very guilty as she gets on the elevator.

In the episode "Smoke Gets in Your CSIs", Eric finally tells Calleigh that he couldn't imagine living his life without her, and in the episode "Sink or Swim", Calleigh and Eric share a kiss after Eric is released from jail for having a fake birth certificate.  In the episode "Wolfe in Sheep's Clothing", Eric is seen waking up nude in Calleigh's bed and they share a bathroom as they get ready in the morning.  As of Season 7, they are in a romantic relationship that they are keeping hidden from the rest of the team.

In the Season 8 episode 14 "In the Wind", Calleigh and Eric are shown kissing passionately in bed in the early morning, Calleigh clad only in Eric's button-down shirt, before they both are interrupted by phone calls. Further into Season 8, Calleigh is shown to have a key to Eric's apartment and their relationship seems to be serious.

During the Season 8 finale ("All Fall Down"), Calleigh is unconscious on the floor and not breathing after someone leaks Halon gas into the lab. Eric comes in, finds her and tries to wake her up, but she doesn't respond. He picks her up and tries to exit the lab with her, but collapses in front of the elevator, unable to breathe due to the gas. Horatio comes in and shoots out the window, bringing oxygen into the lab, thus reviving everyone. After a few moments, Calleigh wakes up. She visits Jesse's body (who had died in the attack) in the morgue and wishes him a safe trip before he's shipped to California for burial and joins the entire team on the basketball court for a game in his honor.

During Season 9, less attention has been paid to the romantic relationship between Calleigh and Eric, leaving it unclear as to whether they are still seeing each other.   This may be due to Emily Procter's pregnancy, at which it was said that it wasn't going to be written in the series.

In season 10 there is still less of a focus on her romantic relationships. Deciding to adopt the North children implies she wants to put her main focus on them. When Eric asks if she needed help with the adoption she declines because she feels their on-and-off relationship is not the right type of environment she wants the children exposed to. However, the romantic feelings are clearly present between the two of them.

Other major events 

Calleigh is targeted by a murderer recently escaped from prison in the season 1 finale. She had been instrumental in putting him away, thanks to her testimony at trial. Despite the danger, she refuses to take herself off the case, much to John Hagen's frustration. Calleigh herself brings the murderer into custody after she catches him at a gun store.

Following Hagen's suicide in her lab at the end of season 3, Calleigh transfers out of ballistics briefly, only to return after she witnesses her successor's incompetence.

In season 6 Calleigh is in her lab when a certain type of bullet rolls off the table. It hits the floor and then shoots right up to the ceiling hitting the lights which causes them to burst. This starts a fire in the lab. After the fire is put out Eric comes in and consoles her while holding her hands. They then both search for one of the three bullets. Eric finds the bullet, to which Calleigh says, "You are my hero."

When Horatio Caine and Eric Delko travel to Brazil in pursuit of murderer Antonio Riaz, Calleigh is given temporary charge of the lab. Despite the geographic distance between them, she does her best to help them in their quest for justice by identifying a substance that leads them closer to Riaz.

During the course of one case, while taking back roads to avoid traffic on the way back to the lab from the scene of a murder, Calleigh is nearly killed when another vehicle forces her off the road into the water. She is able to escape the sinking Hummer, and while much of the evidence gets contaminated by this incident, she and the team eventually manage to solve the case.

She is shot in the line of duty after tracking down and confronting a suspect. The Kevlar vest that she was wearing during the shooting protects her from any serious injury.

After having drinks with Jake, she is involved in a shooting causing her to be questioned by IAB.

Calleigh is exploited on the internet and is cyberstalked, leading to her kidnapping. She is forced to clean up crime scenes for two criminals who hold her at gunpoint; she is later rescued by the team and taken home by Eric Delko.

When Eric's therapist is killed, he and Calleigh go through her confidential files. Calleigh comes across Eric's file and reads what his therapist wrote. She is shocked to read what Eric said during one session: "After I got shot, it really put things in perspective. Made me think about my future, settling down. Be nice if it were Calleigh."  Indicating that he has fallen in love with her.

In mid season seven, she has a delayed reaction to the smoke she had inhaled while trying to save the evidence in a fire with Ryan. Eric requests paramedics to be called and holds Calleigh while trying to keep her calm until they arrive. He rides with her to the hospital where she is treated by Alexx. Eric spends much time at her bedside during which he says, "I can't imagine living my life without you." When she later wakes up she confirms that she heard him and that it was "like a dream" to which he replies "It was real".  They have their first kiss in Season 7 Episode 16 ("Sink or Swim").  In Season 7 Episode 19 ("Target Specific"), Calleigh is working on a gathering evidence when a man, later identified as Sergei Patrenko, puts a bag over her face and steals her gun, but she manages to recover her gun at the end of the episode, and Sergei is shot and killed by a sniper while in custody. In Season 8 Episode 14, "In the Wind", Calleigh is shown in bed with Eric, passionately kissing.

Later in season 10, Calleigh reveals to Eric Delko that she intends to adopt Austin North and his sister Patty, whom she had met in the season 9 finale/season 10 premiere. In the season 10 finale it is revealed that the adoption went through and Calleigh now has full custody of Austin and Patty. But before the adoption is complete, Calleigh tells Eric that there is another couple wanting Austin and Patty, and that she thinks her chances are low. Upon hearing this Eric goes to the adoption counselors and informs them that Calleigh would be a great mom and has the support of the rest of the team to raise the kids, thus helping Calleigh gain custody.

References 

CSI: Miami characters
Fictional characters from Louisiana
Fictional forensic scientists
Miami
Fictional physicists
Television characters introduced in 2002